The Ministry of Lands, Housing and Urban Development (MLHUD), is a cabinet-level government ministry of Uganda. It is responsible for "policy direction, national standards and coordination of all matters concerning lands, housing and urban development". The ministry is headed by a cabinet minister, currently Judith Nabakooba.

Location
The headquarters of the ministry are located at 13-15 Parliament Avenue, in the Central Division of Kampala, Uganda's capital and largest city. The coordinates of the ministry headquarters are 0°18'51.0"N,  32°35'16.0"E (Latitude:0.314167; Longitude:32.587778).

Subministries
The ministry is divided into three sub-ministries, each headed by a minister of state.
 Minister of State, Lands Persis Namuganza
 Minister of State, Housing Chris Baryomunsi
 Minister of State, Urban Development Isaac Musumba

Organisational structure
Administratively, the ministry is divided into the following directorates and departments:
 Directorate of Land Management
 Department of Surveys and Mapping
 Department of Land Valuation
 Department of Land Registration
 Department of Land Administration
 Directorate of Physical Planning and Urban Development
 Department of Physical Planning
 Department of Urban Development
 Department of Land Use Regulation and Compliance
 Directorate of Housing
 Department of Human Settlement
 Department of Housing Development and Estates Management
 Department of Finance and Administration
 Planning and Quality Assurance Department

Tasks
In February 2010, the government of Uganda, in partnership with Thomson Reuters and with funding from the World Bank, began implementation of the Land information System. The system involves the digitization of Uganda's land registry, beginning with key geographical and administrative areas and then rolling the program out to include the entire country. This has improved the country's rank in the ease of doing business and has shortened turn-around times in processes like obtaining a mortgage, selling and buying land, and performing land surveys.

List of ministers

Minister of Lands, Housing and Urban Development
 Judith Nabakooba (8 June 2021-present)
 Beti Kamya-Turwomwe (14 December 2019 - 8 June 2021)
 Betty Amongi (6 June 2016 - 14 December 2019)
 Daudi Migereko (27 May 2011 - 6 June 2016)
 Omara Atubo (1 June 2006 - 27 May 2011)

Minister of Land, Water and the Environment
 Kahinda Otafiire (2003 - 1 June 2006)

See also
Politics of Uganda
Cabinet of Uganda
Parliament of Uganda

References

External links
 

Government ministries of Uganda
Land management ministries
Housing ministries
Urban development ministries